Austria was the host nation of the 1964 Winter Olympics in Innsbruck.

Medalists

Alpine skiing

Men

Men's slalom

Women

Biathlon

Men

 1 Two minutes added per miss.

Bobsleigh

Cross-country skiing

Men

Men's 4 × 10 km relay

Women

Figure skating

Men

Women

Pairs

Ice hockey

First round
Winners (in bold) qualified for the Group A to play for 1st-8th places. Teams, which lost their qualification matches, played in Group B for 9th-16th places.

|}

Consolation Round 

Austria 6-2 Yugoslavia
Austria 3-0 Hungary
Austria 5-5 Japan
Austria 2-5 Romania
Austria 5-3 Italy
Austria 2-8 Norway
Austria 1-5 Poland

Luge

Men

(Men's) Doubles

Women

Nordic combined 

Events:
 normal hill ski jumping 
 15 km cross-country skiing

Ski jumping

Speed skating

Men

References
Official Olympic Reports
International Olympic Committee results database
 Olympic Winter Games 1964, full results by sports-reference.com

Nations at the 1964 Winter Olympics
1964
Summer Olympics